Natalia Germanou (born 22 June 1965) is a Greek songwriter, television hostess, radio producer and journalist.

Germanou has written lyrics for many popular singers such as Anna Vissi, Despina Vandi, Mihalis Hatzigiannis, Notis Sfakianakis, Natasa Theodoridou, Labis Livieratos, Katy Garbi and many more. She co-wrote with Dantis the lyrics to Elena Paparizou's My Number One, the winning entry of the Eurovision Song Contest 2005. She also wrote a Greek song for Armenian singer Sirusho, called Erotas. She has hosted a radio show on Sfera FM during the 2020s as well as having hosted or taken part in numerous reality and talk shows, currently on ANT1 TV network.

Biography
Germanou was born in Athens. Her father is the late Freddy Germanos, a popular journalist and author, and her mother Erietta Mavroudi. For 12 years, Germanou attended the "Mina Aidonopoulou" school, where she got good grades and was good in Math. At the age of 16, Germanou announced to her family that she would like to become an actress, to which her Father suggested journalism instead.

A few years later, Germanou finished a professional journalism school in Athens, and was soon accepted to the Orlando University of Florida where she planned to live for the next 5 years, perfecting her study in journalism. About a month and a half before her planned departure to college, Germanou got a job offer to work at the magazine "Ena" owned by Giorgos Koskotas, and managed by Pavlos Bakogiannis. Germanou, with the guidance of her father, accepted, and stayed in Athens, where for the next 4 years, got experience working for the magazines "Ena" and "Kai" and the newspaper "24 Ores".

In October 1988, at age 19, Germanou started hosting a radio show along with Prokopis Doukas titled "Club Sandwich" on "SKY 100,4". A year later in 1990, Germanou started working with Ant1 Channel and moved her radio show to their radio stations, and started a spin-off musical show of the same name on the channel. At the same time, in 1990, Germanou branched out to writing lyrics, and has since written lyrics for many big Greek singers, with more than 250 songs, and more than 30 platinum and 45 gold records.

For the next 4 years, Germanou continued hosting. "Club Sandwich" later became "Blue Jean", and was broadcast daily on the radio station "Athina 9.84", where she also became a radio producer. At the same time, Germanou started hosting the music show "Mega Star" on Mega Channel, which she continued to host for 10 years. A couple of years later in 1997, Germanou became the programing director and radio producer at the radio station "Sfera 102.2", where she still hosts a radio show today.

In 2002, Germanou hosted the first season of Fame Story, and was later a judge on music related reality shows such as Dream Show 1 and 2, Fame Story 3 and Sound Mix Show. In 2005, Germanou co-wrote the lyrics to the song "My Number One", which won the Eurovision Song Contest 2005". In 2007-2008, she was a judge on the music reality show "TV Stars Parousiaste" on Alpha TV alongside Ilias Psinakis, while she hosted the show "Randevou sta tifla" every Saturday night on Alpha Channel in the same year.

Germanou hosted the morning show "Mes Tin Kali Hara" on Alpha TV and the evening show Chart Show:Your Countdown every Sunday, on the same TV channel.

Personal life
Natalia Germanou married singer Petros Imvrios in October 1998. In 2002 they divorced.

Production discography

The beginning of Germanou's songwriting career is marked by the song "Pos" released in 1990 and sung by Mando. Since then she has written the lyrics to over 250 songs for various artists, with over 30 albums her songs have been included on going Platinum, and over 45 albums going Gold.

Shows
Below are select shows Germanou has been a part of:

Hosting

Radio
 1988-1990 - "Club Sandwich" (SKY FM)
 1990-1994 - "Club Sandwich" (ANT1 FM)
 1994-1997 - "Blue Jean" (Athina 9.84)
 1997–present - "Natalia Germanou" (Sfera FM)

Television
 1990-1992 - "Club Sandwich (Ant1 TV)
 1992-2002 - "Mega Star" (Mega Channel)
 2001-2002 - "Den To Pistevo (Mega Channel)
 2002-2003 - "Fame Story 1 (Ant1 TV)
 2005 - "Figame!" (Ant1 TV)
 2006-2007 - "Sound Mix Show" (Alpha TV)
 2007-2008 - "Rantevou Sta Tifla" (Alpha TV)
 2008–2013 - "Mes Stin Kali Hara" (Alpha TV)
 2009–2012 - "Chart Show: Your Countdown" (Alpha TV)
 2013-2014 - "I Germanou Ksanarxetai" (Ant1 TV)
 2014-2015 - "Mi xanomaste" (E Channel)
 2015-2016 - "Namaste" (E Channel)
 2016-2018 - "Epitelous Savvatokyriako" (E Channel)
 2018–present - "Kalytera de Ginetai" (Alpha TV)

Judging
 2005-2006 - "Fame Story 3" (Ant1 Channel)
 2005 - "Dream Show 1" (Alpha Channel)
 2007 - "Dream Show 2" (Alpha Channel)
 2007-2008 - "TV Star Parousiaste" (Alpha Channel)
 2017 - Star Academy (E Channel)
 2018 - Dancing with the Stars (Ant1 Channel) (Season 6 Guest judge, Live 6)

Acting
Germanou has also appeared in several guest star rolls on various TV shows over the years. Germanou appeared on 2 episodes of "Hai-Rok", which her close friend Eleni Mavili was a writer on, as well as on the shows "Oi Stavloi Tis Eriettas Zaimi", To Kokkino Domatio and "Kinoumeni Ammos". Germanou also appeared on an episode of Anna Vissi's short lived variety show Me Agapi Anna on Ant1 Channel in the mid 1990s, where she sang along with Vissi.

Filmography

Television

References

External links

https://web.archive.org/web/20080226003717/http://clubs.pathfinder.gr/germanou_natalia Official Fansite

Living people
Greek lyricists
Greek television presenters
Greek women television presenters
Eurovision Song Contest winners
Mass media people from Athens
1965 births
Greek radio presenters
Greek women radio presenters